West Orange-Stark High School is a College Preparatory High school in West Orange, Texas, and the only high school in the West Orange-Cove Consolidated Independent School District, though some students report to the West Orange-Stark Academic Alternative Center.

History
The campus of West Orange High School was constructed in 1966, as a part of the West Orange ISD. West Orange ISD, which had West Orange High School (Purple and White Chiefs) and Lutcher-Stark ISD which had Lutcher-Stark High School (Orange and Black Tigers), consolidated in 1977–78. Initially, both high schools operated separately – with four grade levels per campus. In 1977, the two campuses consolidated giving students the opportunity to select new school colors and a new school mascot (Blue and Silver Mustangs). Referred to as the 'West' campus, West Orange-Stark High School's Newton Ave. school (the current WO-SHS) served the district's upperclassmen; the former Lutcher-Stark High school served the ninth and tenth grades as West Orange-Stark High School – East Campus. 

The first class of West Orange-Stark High School graduated in 1978. In the mid-1990's, it was again necessary to close campuses due to drops in enrollment. Before this change was made, the West campus was added on to. The new two-story sections included two halls, a library, a second cafeteria, and enclosed the outside of the existing 600-hall. Along with this came a new Athletic, Band, and Theater building, on the west side of the campus, and a Career and Technology Center on the east side of the campus. All of these buildings are still present.

2009 renovation
In 2009, as a part of the 2007 Bond, the high school was renovated and remodeled. It got a new facade, which allowed more organized and safer entrances. The high school received the least amount of renovations, as it was in the best shape. The high school renovations were the first to be completed.

2011 retirement and resignation incentive
Due to minor local fund balance shortfalls, and projected state fund balance shortfalls, the West Orange-Cove CISD offered district staff a 10% (of annual pay) sign-off bonus. Retirees and resignees include; longtime coach and Athletic director Dan Hooks; 3 Industrial Trade teachers, which includes 1 Drivers Education teacher; Food Production staff, and many core class teachers. The district also decided to lay off 15 probationary employees, who have less than 2 years of service. The district decided also to cut the business program, allowing the 2 remaining Business teachers to teach Technology courses.

Administration
As of August 2010, the principal is Mr. Hutcherson Hill, who served in the same position Sul Ross Elementary, and Lake Air Middle School, both of the Waco Independent School District. Mr. Hill also served as an Assistant Principal at Waco High School. Other administrators include;
Kevin Hayes, Assistant Principal – Classes of 2015, 2013
Lynda Willie, Assistant Principal – Classes of 2014, 2016
Michelle Duhon, Curriculum Coordinator
Rod Anderson, whom serves as the Coordinator of the Academic Alternative Center.

Academics
Due to revision of the accountability system by the Texas Education Agency, West Orange-Stark High School has no rating for the Accountability year of 2012.

The school offers many AP and Dual-Enrollment classes, (Lamar State College- Orange Courses) for Juniors and Seniors. Along with the Career Center courses, and core education classes, other electives offered include; Drivers Education, Individual Sports, Team Sports, Aerobic Activities, Foundations of Personal Fitness, Dance, Art, Theatre Production, Technical Theater, Musical Theory, Choral Music, Instrumental Ensemble, and others.

The school also offers a credit recovery-advancement program, along with Credit by Examination tests in the Summer and Winter.

The campus utilizes an '8-period day' schedule.

West Orange-Stark High School was named a 'Mentor High School' in 2000.

WO-SHS has also been named a part of "High Schools that Work" for several years.

The school newspaper is the 'Mustang Message'
The yearbook is the 'Mustang Memories'

Career Center
The WOSHS Career Center is highly successful. Students from all 5 districts in Orange County utilize the Career Center, which offers many trades needed in the job market. These courses include; Concepts of Engineering & Technology, Principles of Architecture & Construction, Construction Management, Construction Technology, Practicum in Construction Management, (Principles of Art, A/V Technology, and Communication), Animation, Practicum in A/V Production, Graphic Design and Illustration, Principles of Informative Technology, Digital & Interactive Media, Research in Informative Technology Solutions, Touch Systems Data Entry, Principles of Education, Interpersonal Studies, Practicum in Health Science, Gerontology, Medical Terminology, Pharmacy Technology, Principles of Hospitality and Tourism, Culinary Arts, Principles of Manufacturing, Building Maintenance Technology, Precision Metal Manufacturing, Scientific Research & Design, Robotics & Automation, Principles of Transportation & Logistics, Energy Power and Transportation Systems, and many more. (Course availability is based on student interest).

The Machining, Building Trades, and Media Technology departments of the Career Center have won various awards among the State's VICA group.

Athletics
The Mustangs have several state and regional championships in all sports. The Mustangs Home stadium is named after Coach Dan Hooks, who was Athletic Director for 20+ years. Many WO-S High alumni become successful in both college and professional sports, such as recent graduate Earl Thomas, who was drafted in 2010 by the Seattle Seahawks.

During a Sept.17, 2010 game, team Quarterback Reginald Garrett walked to the sidelines and fell to the ground. It was rumored that he was having a seizure and also rumored that he had a history of seizures.  His mother explained that he only had one seizure when he was three years old from a high fever and none since. While still conscious, he was removed from the field by paramedics. He was later pronounced dead at Memorial-Hermann Baptist Hospital – Orange. As the word of his death made its way across the stadium, fans poured out of Hooks Stadium to go visit the player's family at the hospital. The following game was cancelled.

In 2011, as a part of the retirement incentive plan, longtime Athletic Director Dan R Hooks retired. Coach Cornel Thompson was selected to take his place.

On December 18, 2015, they won the State 4A/D2 Football Championship Game 22–3 over Celina High School, finishing the season with a record of 15–1, this was the 3rd time that the Mustangs won the a State Football Championship.

They won the 4A/D2 State Championship game again in 2016 defeating Sweetwater High School 24-6 for their 4th State Football Championship.

Extra-curriculars
West Orange-Stark High School offers students the following clubs and organizations:

Academic Team, 
Art Club, 
Band, 
Business Professionals of America, 
Cheerleaders, 
Choir, 
Culinary Arts Club, 
DECA, 
Drama Club (Thespians), 
Drill Team, 
Foreign Language Club, 
Homecoming, 
HOSA, 
Key Club, 
Library Club, 
Mustangs for the Master, 
National Forensic League, 
National Honor Society, 
Press Club, 
Prom Court, 
Science Team, 
Stark Reading Contest, 
Student Government, 
TAFE (Texas Association of Future Educators), 
TEAM TCA- Competitors for Christ, 
VICA – Auto Collision Repair, 
VICA – Auto Technology, 
VICA – Building Trades, 
VICA – Media Technology, 
VICA – Metal Trade.

School Song
Far out on the coastal prairie

standing plain to view,

is our dear West Orange-Stark High School,

towering toward the blue.

Hail! All hail, our Alma Mater,

hail West Orange-Stark High!

We bear thee a love so fervent

it shall never die!

Notable alumni

Ernest Anderson, former professional football player
Tom Byron, pornographic actor, director, and producer
Chris Cole, former professional football player, Denver Broncos
Jim Colvin, former professional football player, Baltimore Colts, Dallas Cowboys, and New York Giants 
Ox Emerson, former professional football player, Detroit Lions
Pat Gibbs, former professional football player, Philadelphia Eagles Graduated from Lutcher-Stark, before the consolidation 
Greg Hill, former professional football player, Houston Oilers, Kansas City Chiefs, and Los Angeles Raiders
Chuck Knipp, comedian
John Patterson, former professional baseball player, Arizona Diamondbacks and Montreal Expos/Washington Nationals
Kevin Smith, former professional football player, Dallas Cowboys
Earl Thomas, former professional football player, Baltimore Ravens and Seattle Seahawks
Deionte Thompson, former professional football player, Arizona Cardinals

References

Schools in Orange County, Texas
Public high schools in Texas